The 2009–10 Football League One was Exeter City F.C.'s first season back in the third tier of English football since 1994. This article shows statistics of the club's players in the season, and also lists all matches that the club has played during the season.

Match results

Legend

Football League One

League Cup

FA Cup

Football League Trophy

Squad statistics 
Appearances for competitive matches only

See also 
 2009–10 in English football
 Exeter City F.C.

External links 
 Exeter City official website
 Exeter City 2009–10 season players stats at Soccerbase

Exeter City
Exeter City F.C. seasons